Osumanu (also known as Usman I or Usman I Maje Ringim dan Dabo) was an Emir of Kano who reigned from 1846 to 1855.

Biography in the Kano Chronicle
Below is a biography of Osumanu from Palmer's 1908 English translation of the Kano Chronicle.

References

Emirs of Kano
19th-century rulers in Africa